The East View Stakes is an American Thoroughbred horse race run annually at Aqueduct Racetrack in Queens, New York. It is restricted to fillies bred in the State of New York. Run in December, the race
is contested on dirt over a distance of  miles.

The race was inaugurated in 1910 at the Empire City Race Track in Yonkers, New York as a contest for horses of either sex. Due to a New York State ban on parimutuel betting there was no race run in 1911, 1912, or 1913. It was not run in 1915 and in 1953 the event was suspended indefinitely. It was revived in 1978 with its current entry restrictions. The race was hosted by the Jamaica Race Course from 1943 through 1946, at Belmont Park in 1947, and again at the Jamaica Race Course from 1948 through 1953 after which it was moved to its present location at Aqueduct Racetrack.

The race was named for "East View", the name of the Westchester County, New York estate of James Butler, founder of the Empire City Race Track.

Notable winners from the pre 1953 era include National Museum of Racing and Hall of Fame inductees Native Dancer and Tom Fool. In the 1942 edition of the East View Stakes, Gold Shower upset Count Fleet.

On its return in 1978 as a race for fillies only, the East View Stakes was contested at a distance of seven furlongs until 1982 when it was run at one mile (eight furlongs). From 1987 through 1992 it reverted to seven furlongs then in 1993 it was run on turf at a distance of one mile. In 1994 the distance was set at its current  miles (eight and one half furlongs).

In 2012 it was again run at 1 mile but returned in 2013 to its former current distance of 8.32 furlongs.

Records
Speed  record: (since 1994 at current distance of  miles)

Most wins by a jockey:
 3 – Eddie Arcaro (1941, 1947, 1948)
 3 – Jorge Velásquez (1979, 1982, 1985)
 3 – Alan Garcia (2007, 2009, 2010)

Winners since 1978

Earlier winners & jockey

1953 – Fisherman (Hedley Woodhouse)
1952 – Native Dancer (Eric Guerin)
1951 – Tom Fool (Ted Atkinson)
1950 – Nullify (Douglas Dodson) †
1949 – Selector (Arnold Kirkland)
1948 – Sport Page (Eddie Arcaro)
1947 – Better Self (Eddie Arcaro)
1946 – Grand Admiral (Job Dean Jessop)
1945 – Mist o' Gold (Ted Atkinson)
1944 – War Jeep (Albert Snider)
1943 – Stronghold (John Gilbert)
1942 – Gold Shower (Billie Thompson)
1941 – Requested (Eddie Arcaro)
1940 – Omission (Don Meade)
1939 – Williamstown (Don Meade)
1938 – Entracte (Sam Renick)
1937 – Pasteurized (Wayne D. Wright)
1936 – No Sir (Ira Hanford)
1935 – Bien Joli (John Gilbert)
1934 – Below Zero (Calvin S. Rainey)
1933 – Sgt. Byrne (Howard Cruz)
1932 – Lucky Chance (Linus McAtee)
1931 – Universe (Thomas Malley)
1930 – Checkerberry (Raymond Workman)
1929 – Mokatam (Laverne Fator)
1928 – Lycidas (Edgar Barnes)
1927 – Sun Edwin (Eddie Ambrose)
1926 – General Lee (Fred Stevens)
1925 – Pompey (Charles Fairbrother)
1924 – Turf Idol (James H. Burke)
1923 – Peter King (Clarence Turner)
1922 – Caveat Emptor (Linus McAtee)
1921 – Kai-Sang (Earl Sande) †
1920 – Ten-Lec (Albert Johnson)
1919 – Miss Jemina (Johnny Loftus)
1918 – Ute (George Walls)
1917 – Cum Sah (Roscoe Troxler)
1916 – Tom Taggart (Edward Taplin)
1915 – no race
1914 – Pebbles (Joe Kederis)
1913 – no race
1912 – no race
1911 – no race
1910 – Amalfi (A. Thomas)

 † In 1921, Runstar finished first but was disqualified.
 † In 1950, the race was won by Maine Chance Farm's Win or Lose but who was later disqualified when it was found he had carried an incorrect weight assignment.

References
 New York Racing Association
 Details and history of the East View stakes at the NYRA

Flat horse races for two-year-old fillies
Horse races in New York (state)
Ungraded stakes races in the United States
Recurring sporting events established in 1910
Aqueduct Racetrack
Jamaica Race Course
1910 establishments in New York (state)